Unity Books is an independent New Zealand bookseller. It has a flagship store in Wellington, and a location in Auckland with separate adult and children's bookshops.

The business was founded by Alan Preston in 1967.

Wellington store
In 2012, the Wellington store celebrated its 45 anniversary, although it has only been at its current location for 16 years. The store, on Willis Street in central Wellington, was renovated and expanded in 2011. The store is co-owned and managed by Tilly Lloyd.

Unity Books Wellington is part of the "Culture Vulture" scheme, whereby customers can buy vouchers and redeem them at any of Unity Books, Slow Boat Records, or Aro Video.

Notable events
Unity Books runs approximately 45 author events and launches per year and the shop works extensive off-site events as well. Except for 2 Festivals, Unity Books has been the contracted bookseller for Writers and Readers Week, the most intellectually muscled of the NZ literary festivals. In October 2013, Eleanor Catton's Man Booker prize-winning The Luminaries was launched at the store.

In August 2014, Nicky Hager's book Dirty Politics was launched at the store with a media pack and crowd of approximately 250.

References

External links
Unity Books

Unity Books profile at Booksellers New Zealand

Bookshops of New Zealand
Bookstores established in the 20th century